The Rhino Cup (named the Kobus Botha Rhino Cup after the South African Rugby League Hall of Famer, formerly the Rhino Club Challenge) is a semi-professional rugby league competition in South Africa and is the national first division competition. The competition currently consists of eight teams. The current holders are the TUKS Reds, based in the University of Pretoria, who beat the St Helens Vultures 30-22 in the 2021-22 Grand Final.

Current Teams

Former Teams

See also

 Protea Cup
 Western Province Rugby League

References

External links

South Africa Rugby League
Rugby league competitions
Sports leagues established in 2011
2011 establishments in South Africa